Femina Miss India Bangalore  is a beauty pageant in India that annually selects three winners to compete nationally . The winner of Femina Miss India Bangalore  vies in Miss India. It is organized by Femina, a women's magazine published by Bennett, Coleman & Co. Ltd. The Times Group also conducts a stand-alone contest called Indian Diva to select a representative to Miss Universe .

Final results

Sub Contest Awards

Contestants

Judges 
Sarah-Jane Dias
Rochelle Maria Rao
Ragini Dwivedi
Ritu Kumar
Karan Johar.

References

Live Updates Pond's Femina Miss India 2013 Contest

2013 beauty pageants in India
Femina Miss India
Female models from Bangalore